Leonhard von Laiming (1381 – 24 June 1451) was a German prince-bishop of Passau from 1424 until his death in 1451.

References 

Prince-bishops in the Holy Roman Empire

Roman Catholic bishops of Passau
1381 births
1451 deaths